Sonexay Siphandone (born 26 January 1966) is a Laotian politician and member of the Lao People's Revolutionary Party (LPRP). He is the son of former LPRP Chairman Khamtai Siphandon and brother of Viengthong Siphandone. On December 30, 2022, parliament approved Sonexay Siphandone as Prime Minister (149 of 151 votes).

Sonexay was born in 1966. He was elected to the LPRP Central Committee at the 8th National Congress in 2006, and to the LPRP Politburo at the 10th National Congress in 2016. He was Deputy Prime Minister from 2016 to 2022.

References

Specific

Bibliography
Books:
 

1966 births
Living people
Place of birth missing (living people)
Deputy Prime Ministers of Laos
Government ministers of Laos
Governors of Champasak
Lao People's Revolutionary Party politicians
Members of the 8th Central Committee of the Lao People's Revolutionary Party
Members of the 9th Central Committee of the Lao People's Revolutionary Party
Members of the 10th Central Committee of the Lao People's Revolutionary Party
Members of the 11th Central Committee of the Lao People's Revolutionary Party
Members of the 10th Politburo of the Lao People's Revolutionary Party
Members of the 11th Politburo of the Lao People's Revolutionary Party
Prime Ministers of Laos